Aphrodisias was a city in ancient Caria.

Aphrodisias may refer to:
Aphrodisias (planthopper), an insect
Aphrodisias (Cilicia), a town of ancient Cilicia
Aphrodisias (Cyprus), a city of ancient Cyprus
Aphrodisias (Laconia), a town of ancient Laconia
Aphrodisias (Thrace), a town of ancient Thrace
Aphrodisias, ancient name of Bozburun Peninsula in Turkey

See also
Aphrodisiac (disambiguation)